South Africa Medal may refer to:

 South Africa Medal (1853)
 South Africa Medal (1880)

See also
Queen's South Africa Medal (1899-1902)
King's South Africa Medal (1899-1902)